Shushtar County is in Khuzestan province, Iran. The capital of the county is the city of Shushtar. At the 2006 census, the county's population was 182,282 in 37,656 households. The following census in 2011 counted 191,444 people in 45,360 households. At the 2016 census, the county's population was 192,028 in 50,878 households.

Administrative divisions

The population history and structural changes of Shushtar County's administrative divisions over three consecutive censuses are shown in the following table. The latest census shows three districts, six rural districts, and four cities.

References

 

Counties of Khuzestan Province